Brian J. Claar (born July 29, 1959) is an American professional golfer.

Early life 
Claar was born in Santa Monica, California. He play college golf at the University of Tampa where he was a two-time All-American. He was inducted into their Athletic Hall of Fame in 1989.

Professional career 
Claar turned professional in 1981. He played on the PGA Tour from 1986 to 1998. He was selected as the PGA Rookie of the Year in 1986. His best finish was a T-2 at the 1991 AT&T Pebble Beach National Pro-Am. He then played primarily on the Nationwide Tour from 1999 to 2002. His best finishes on this tour were a pair of T-2s in 2002, a playoff loss at the Hershey Open and T-2 at the Utah Classic. 

Outside of the United States, Claar had success on the Asia Golf Circuit. In 1989 he claimed the Order of Merit title having won twice during the season, at the Hong Kong and Thailand opens.

Claar twice finished in the top-10 at a major. At the 1989 U.S. Open, he finished fifth, two shots behind Curtis Strange. At the 1992 PGA Championship, he finished tied for ninth, six shots behind Nick Price.

Claar has also worked as Champions Tour official.

Professional wins (3)

Asia Golf Circuit wins (2)

Other wins (1)
1983 Rhode Island Open

Playoff record
Buy.com Tour playoff record (0–1)

Results in major championships

CUT = missed the half-way cut
"T" = tied

See also
1985 PGA Tour Qualifying School graduates
1989 PGA Tour Qualifying School graduates

References

External links

American male golfers
PGA Tour golfers
Golfers from Santa Monica, California
University of Tampa alumni
1959 births
Living people